Umbetovo (Ömbät) is a rural locality (a village) in Muynaksky Selsoviet, Zianchurinsky District, Bashkortostan, Russia. The population was 413 as of 2010. There are 7 streets.

Geography 
Umbetovo is located 33 km southeast of Isyangulovo (the district's administrative centre) by road. Verkhny Muynak is the nearest rural locality.

References 

Rural localities in Zianchurinsky District